Grebnev is a Russian male surname, its feminine counterpart is Grebneva. It may refer to

Aleksandr Grebnev (born 1947), Russian association football player
Anton Grebnev (born 1984), Russian association football player
Grigorii Grebnev (1902–1960), Russian journalist and writer
Oleg Grebnev (born 1968), Russian team handball player